The gopher tortoise (Gopherus polyphemus) is a species of tortoise in the family Testudinidae. The species is native to the southeastern United States. The gopher tortoise is seen as a keystone species because it digs burrows that provide shelter for at least 360 other animal species. G. polyphemus is threatened by predation and habitat destruction.

The gopher tortoise is a representative of the genus Gopherus, which contains the only tortoises native to North America. The gopher tortoise is the state reptile of Georgia and the state tortoise of Florida.

Etymology
The specific name, polyphemus, refers to the cave-dwelling giant, Polyphemus, of Greek mythology. Gopher tortoises are so named because of some species' habit of digging large, deep burrows like the gopher.

Description
The gopher tortoise is a terrestrial reptile that possesses forefeet that are well adapted for burrowing, and elephantine hind feet. These features are common to most tortoises. The front legs have scales to protect the tortoise while burrowing. G. polyphemus is dark brown to gray-black in overall color, with a yellow plastron (bottom shell). A gular projection is evident on the anterior plastron where the head projects from the shell. Sexual dimorphism is evident, with the male gopher tortoise having a concave plastron, while that of the female is flat. In addition, the gular projection of a male plastron is generally longer than that of a female. The carapace is at least twice as long as it is high.

Behavior

Diet

Gopher tortoises are herbivore scavengers and opportunistic grazers. Thus, their diets contains over 300 species of plants, with the dominant plants within their environment likely making up the bulk of their diet. They consume a very wide range of plants, but mainly eat broad-leaved grass, regular grass, wiregrass, and terrestrial legumes. However, other plant parts, including shoots, stems, leaves, and pine needles are also eaten. They also eat mushrooms, and fruits such as gopher apple, pawpaw, blackberries, and saw palmetto berries. In addition, gopher tortoises eat flowers from the genera Cnidoscolus (nettles), Tillandsia (Spanish and ball moss), Richardia, and Dyschoriste. A very small portion of the tortoises’ diet is composed of fungi, lichens, carrion, bones, insects, and feces, eaten more commonly by females before and after nesting time. Juvenile tortoises tend to eat more legumes, which are higher in protein, and fewer grasses and tough, fibrous plants than mature tortoises. As gopher tortoises usually get water from the food they eat, they usually only drink standing water in times of extreme drought.

Burrowing
Gopher tortoises, like other tortoises of the genus Gopherus, are known for their digging ability. Gopher tortoises spend most of their time in long burrows (up to 80% of their time). The length and depth of the burrow vary with the depth of sand and depth of the water table. In these burrows, the tortoises are protected from summer heat, winter cold, fire, and predators. The burrows are especially common in longleaf pine savannas, where the tortoises are the primary grazers, playing an essential role in their ecosystem. Except during breeding season, gopher tortoises are solitary animals, inhabiting a small home range. Within their range they dig several burrows.

Life span
Gopher tortoises can live more than 40 years.  One current specimen, Gus (age 100—the oldest known living gopher tortoise—as of 2022), has been living continuously in captivity at the Nova Scotia Museum of Natural History in Halifax for 75 years  and is believed to have hatched between 1920 and 1925. Additionally, there are journalistic reports of a specimen in North Texas with a verified age of 75–78 years old.

Male tortoises reach adulthood at approximately 9–12 years of age, and females may take up to 10–21 years to reach maturity. Maturation time may vary based on local resource abundance and latitude. Gopher tortoises prefer to live solitary lifestyles, burrowing alone and only breaking this during mating season

Breeding and reproduction

Sexual reproduction involves courtship rituals. During the mating season between April and November, females lay their eggs in the open; about 1–25 eggs incubate underground for 100 days. The sex of the eggs is determined by the temperature where they are incubated in a nest laid below sand. If the sand is over 30 degrees Celsius, it is a female and if below 30 degrees Celsius, the egg is a male. Incubation period can last from 80 to 90 days in Florida and 110 days in South Carolina.

Gopher tortoises may mate from February through September, with a peak throughout May and June. Females may lay clutches of 3–14 eggs, depending on body size, in a sandy mound very close to the entrance of their burrow.

Ninety percent of clutches may be destroyed by predators such as armadillos, raccoons, foxes, skunks, and alligators before the eggs hatch, and less than 6% of eggs are expected to grow into tortoises that live one year or more after hatching. As the tortoises age, they have fewer natural predators. Egg predation rates are unchanged regardless of whether nests are close to or remain far from burrows. Additionally, a denser soil composition may affect hatchlings' ability to emerge due to the hatchlings' apparent inability to dig themselves out of the nest.

Social behaviour 
It has been suggested that gopher tortoises, more than other tortoise species, exhibit social behaviour. While primarily solitary creatures, gopher tortoises live in well-defined colonies which are similar to those of highly social animals such as the Prairie dog. The distribution and proximity of burrows might be the consequence of social relationships between tortoises. Some females have been observed visiting the burrows of a particular female repeatedly, even if there are other tortoises closerby. This may be a sort of 'friendship', but such terms are not normally used to describe the relationships between animals. Female gopher tortoises generally do not relocate once they have moved into a colony and larger males usually have their burrows adjacent to females in the spring. It has been found that males can travel up to 500m to visit females and their burrows.

Conservation concerns

Historically

Since July 7, 1987, the U.S. Fish and Wildlife Service (USFWS) has listed Gopherus polyphemus as "Threatened" wherever the tortoises are found west of the Mobile and Tombigbee Rivers in Alabama, Mississippi, and Louisiana. Its status is listed as "Under Review" in Florida and in other locations. On November 9, 2009, the U.S. Fish and Wildlife Service proposed rulemaking to include the eastern population of Gopherus polyphemus in the List of Threatened Wildlife. G. polyphemus appears on the IUCN Red List as a "Vulnerable" species; however, it has not been assessed for the purposes of this list since 1996. In July 2011, the USFWS determined that listing the eastern population of the tortoise as Threatened under the Endangered Species Act is warranted, however, it is precluded from doing so at this time due to higher priority actions and a lack of sufficient funds to commence proposed rule development. In the interim period of time the USFWS will place the eastern population of the tortoise on its candidate species list until sufficient funding is available to initiate a proposed listing rule. In 2018, the IUCN Tortoise and Freshwater Turtle Specialist Group recommended a re-assessment and re-classification of all six Gopherus species This reclassification would move G. polyphemus from Vulnerable (VU) to Endangered (EN). NatureServe considers the species to be Vulnerable.

The Conservation Clinic at the University of Florida's Levin College of Law describes five main threats to the tortoise population, which are: (1) habitat loss through human development, (2) habitat loss through poor supervision, (3) human desire to use it as a pet or eat it as meat (see human predation), (4) relocation causing population disruption, and (5) disease caused by relocation.

In Mississippi, along State Route 63, chain link fences were built to prevent gopher tortoise mortality from traffic. These fences, made from heavy gauge wire for durability, are three feet high and are buried one foot below the surface. The fences have "turnarounds" at either end, which are angled fences that redirect tortoises back into the area from which they come. As of 2003, no roadside gopher tortoise deaths had been reported along Route 63 since the construction of the fences.

On July 27, 2016, the Florida Fish and Wildlife Conservation Commission issued a warning to residents and visitors to the state not to paint the shell of a Gopher Tortoise, as the paint can hinder their ability to absorb vitamins they need from the sun, cause respiratory problems, allow toxic chemicals into the bloodstream, and other harmful effects. The commission has also stated that it is illegal to do so otherwise.

Head-start and release programs have been shown to be effective methods of combating Gopher Tortoise population decline. At the Yuchi Wildlife Management Area in Burke County, Georgia, during 2014 and 2015 145 tortoises were released and tracked. Survivorship was variable throughout the study but site fidelity remained high. Since tortoises were staying in the same area after release it could be a viable method of population recovery. Release strategy and predator mitigation are essential to its success.

Keystone species

Gopher tortoises are known as a keystone species.
The Florida Fish and Wildlife Conservation Commission states the gopher tortoise provides temporary or permanent refuge for as many as 350 to 400 species, whether the gopher tortoise is present or not. The burrows are used for feeding, resting, reproduction, and protection from temperature extremes, moisture loss, and predators. These species include gopher frogs (Rana capito), several species of snake, such as the eastern indigo snake (Drymarchon couperi), small invertebrates, and burrowing owls (Athene cunicularia). Several species associated with gopher tortoise burrows are listed as endangered, threatened, or species of special concern by the US Fish and Wildlife Service. Therefore, conservation efforts focused on the gopher tortoise aid these species as well.

Additionally, gopher tortoise burrows may benefit plant life by exposing mineral soil favorable for germination.

Habitat conversion

Conversion of gopher tortoise habitat to urban areas, croplands, and pasture, along with adverse forest management practices, has drastically reduced the historic range of the gopher tortoise. The taking of gopher tortoises for sale or use as food or pets has also had a serious effect on some populations. The seriousness of the loss of adult tortoises is magnified by the length of time required for tortoises to reach maturity and their low reproductive rate. According to the website of the Brevard Zoo in Melbourne, Florida, current estimates of human predation and road mortality alone are at levels that could offset any annual addition to the population, and sightings of gopher tortoises have become rare in many areas, and the ones sighted are much smaller than in the past. A number of other species also prey upon gopher tortoises, including the raccoon, which is the primary egg and hatchling predator, gray foxes, striped skunks, nine-banded armadillos, dogs, and snakes. Red imported fire ants also have been known to prey on hatchlings. A 1980 report indicated clutch and hatchling losses often approach 90 percent.

In the past, approximately 83,955 gopher tortoises were incidentally taken (destroyed) and 137,759 acres of gopher tortoise habitat was permitted for development in Florida as developers could acquire Florida Fish and Wildlife Conservation Commission Incidental Take Permits to build in the gopher tortoises' natural habitat. Additional gopher tortoise habitat was lost due to issuance of Special Tortoise Relocation Permits and Standard Tortoise Relocation Permits, but the total acreage of habitat lost and total number of gopher tortoises relocated cannot be estimated due to issuance of these two types of permits. On July 31, 2007, the Florida Fish and Wildlife Conservation Commission implemented new permitting rules requiring developers to relocate tortoises. Starting on April 22, 2009, three types of permits were available in Florida for developers wishing to build on gopher tortoise habitat. Two of these permits allow for the relocation of gopher tortoises, either to some other place on the site being used for construction, or to a recipient site which has been certified by the Florida Fish and Wildlife Conservation Commission. The third type of permit allows for temporary relocation of tortoises while major utility lines are installed. In the third case, the tortoises are returned to their habitat after construction is complete.

Threats

Human predation

Tortoises are subjected to predation by other animals, including by humans. People have eaten gopher tortoises for thousands of years. During the Great Depression, the gopher tortoise was known as the "Hoover Chicken" because they were eaten by poor people out of work. Some people see gopher tortoise meat as a delicacy, or as simply a free source of meat. Although it is now illegal to hunt gopher tortoises or possess their meat or shells, illegal hunting was still taking place  at an unsustainable rate, with some colonies being driven to extinction. In 2006, police uncovered "five pounds of tortoise meat in [a] man's refrigerator" after they spotted empty tortoise shells along a highway in Florida.  In nineteen counties in Alabama,  tortoise was listed as "game species," though one with "no open season."

Gopher tortoises have been kept as pets, preventing them from reproducing in their local populations. Captured gopher tortoises could be raced in tortoise races, but this practice was banned in Florida in 1989. Moving a tortoise can lead to harmful consequences to the environment from which it came, because the tortoise is often not returned to the same place where it was found. Also, as tortoise racing involves several tortoises in close proximity to one another, diseases can easily spread from one tortoise to another. If an infected captive tortoise is then returned to the environment, other tortoises may be infected.

Climate change
Climate change poses another challenge for the gopher tortoise through alteration of habitat, but they are adapting by way of natural selection. According to the Florida Fish and Wildlife Conservation Commission, rising temperature and change in rainfall patterns may increase the numbers of invasive species which if more adapted to these environmental changes could drive out native plants essential for tortoise's diet. Invasive species can cause habitat fragmentation and increase stress to Gopher tortoises and other native animals. Warmer temperatures cause sea level to rise and more extreme weather to occur. Extreme periods of rainfall and drought will cause fewer lands to become available. There will also be an increase or decrease in water availability. One meter rise in sea level leads to loss of 20% of existing conservation lands and 30% of the natural habitats. However, based on current sea level rise, a one-meter rise in ocean levels would occur only after the passage of several centuries.  As the sea level rises, it will move storms closer to land and affect both coastal and marine environments. Species may move inland as less land is accessible. This can increase the spread of diseases or disrupt food cycles and reproduction.

Habitat loss
In 1987, human urbanization and various human activities in Mississippi, Louisiana, and Alabama caused dramatic declines in the tortoise population, and the U.S. Fish and Wildlife Service listed them as "endangered." Even though the population declined in Florida, Georgia, and South Carolina, they were not yet listed as threatened at the time.  However, in recent years, habitat loss is increasing as southern states continue to experience human population growth, and expand on highway road construction. The southeast has had a 20% increase in human population between 1990 and 2000.

One of the most suitable habitats for gopher tortoise is the longleaf pine ecosystem, which provides suitable well-drained and sandy soils for tortoises to inhabit. Longleaf pine forests include abundant low herbaceous plant growth and open canopy/space for tortoise's eggs to incubate. Since European settlement, longleaf pine decreased in area by an estimated of 96%, which has contributed to an 80% decrease in population densities of gopher tortoise. This means that there is only 4% of longleaf pine remaining.

Over its range in the southeast, there are still four large core areas that provide the opportunity to protect large areas of tortoise habitat, as well the biological diversity of the coastal plain. They are (from west to east) De Soto National Forest, Eglin Air Force Base, Apalachicola National Forest, and Okefenokee Swamp in Florida. These areas offer an opportunity to restore forest stands and land areas containing populations of native vertebrate animals threatened by habitat fragmentation. Restoring the natural causal factors of fire, especially, and flooding would also assist in restoring the plant and animal communities.

Gopher tortoises could potentially lose  of their habitats if Florida's population doubles. This will cause more competition for water resources between animals and humans. The low reproductive rate of the tortoise makes it more vulnerable to declines in longleaf ecosystem and extinction.

Habitat fragmentation 
Anthropogenic activity appears to not only result in habitat loss but also habitat fragmentation. Turtles and tortoises are strongly impacted by railways, which can act as barriers to movement. Radio telemetry data show that gopher tortoises cross railways significantly less frequently than expected. Tortoises also have poor ability to escape from railways after entering the area between the rails. Railway habituated tortoises (those believed to live near railways and interact with them) and naïve tortoises (those unlikely to frequently interact with railways) do not differ substantially in their railway escape behavior, suggesting that prior experience may not improve tortoises’ ability to escape from railways that they have entered. Trenches dug beneath railways can facilitate movement across and escape from railways. As railways are prevalent throughout the gopher tortoise’s geographic range, implementation of railway trenches may improve population connectivity and reduce habitat fragmentation.

Diseases
Gopher tortoises are known to contract upper respiratory tract diseases (URTDs) caused by various microorganisms, including the bacterium Mycoplasma agassizii and iridovirus and herpes viruses. Symptoms of URTDs include serous, mucoid, or purulent discharge from the nares, excessive tearing to purulent ocular discharge, conjunctivitis, and edema of the eyelids and ocular glands. M. agassizii is known to exist in tortoises without showing obvious symptoms. Little is known about why some tortoises test positive and live for years, while others become seriously ill and die. The antibiotic enrofloxacin has been used to treat bacterial URTDs in G. polyphemus. However, there is no cure for URTD.

Although long-term studies indicate URTDs can cause population declines in desert tortoise populations 10–15 years after initial infection, studies of such length have not been performed on G. polyphemus. One study, which observed G. polyphemus tortoises in Florida from 2003 to 2006, returned the unexpected observation that tortoises which were seropositive for URTD antibodies were less likely to die over that time than seronegative tortoises. However, the habitats of more seropositive populations had more remains of dead tortoises. The investigators offered the explanation that seropositive tortoises had survived an initial infection, then developed chronic disease. This evidence may imply a possible acute effect on mortality, followed by chronic disease in surviving individuals. Further studies are needed to more fully understand the effects of URTD on this species.

Longleaf forest conservation

Since the preservation of the longleaf pine ecosystem in particular is required for the maintenance of the gopher tortoise, conservation efforts are needed to maintain this endangered ecosystem. The longleaf pine ecosystem provides extreme conditions such as "nutrient" deprived soil and "sandy sites" for gopher's habitation.  The longleaf pine is a relatively long-lived tree for this region of the world, with individual trees often persisting for several centuries.
Conserving these forests would provide the natural habitats gopher tortoises need.

Successful reforestation efforts have been made. According to the Environmental Defense Fund's website, environmentalists and private land owners are working together to maintain the wildlife habitat while maintaining crops productivity. Groups provide assistance to private landowners to ensure funding for conservation incentives to landowners who are willing to preserve wildlife on their soil. Most lands in the East are privately owned. Landowners used "prescribed burns' to restore favorable habitat conditions. Prescribed burns managed by the Safe Harbor Agreement benefits U.S. Fish & Wildlife, serve under Federal Endangered Species Act help reduces and prevents the amount of invasive species that are threatening to the tortoise; Invasive species such as the (1) cogongrass aka Imperata cylindrica and (2) Fire ants disrupt gopher tortoise's habitat and kill tortoise eggs can be controlled. Prescribed fire is one method to provide sufficient ground for the tortoise and its eggs to survive and maintain biodiversity.

References

Citations

Bibliography
 

GUYER, C., JOHNSON, V. M., & HERMANN, S. M. (2012). Effects of Population Density on Patterns of Movement and Behavior of Gopher Tortoises (Gopherus Polyphemus). Herpetological Monographs, 26(1), 122–134. https://doi.org/10.1655/HERPMONOGRAPHS-D-10-00004.1

Further reading
Daudin FM (1801). Histoire Naturelle, Générale et Particulière des Reptiles; ouvrage faisant suite à l'Histoire générale et particulière, composée par Leclerc de Buffon, et rédigée par C.S. Sonnini, membre des plusieurs sociétés savantes. Tome Second [Volume 2]. Paris: F. Dufart. 432 pp. (Testudo polyphemus, new species, pp. 256–259). (in French and Latin).
Goin CJ, Goin OB, Zug GB (1978). Introduction to Herpetology, Third Edition. San Francisco: W.H. Freeman and Company. xi + 378 pp. . (Gopherus polyphemus, p. 155).
Powell R, Conant R, Collins JT (2016). Peterson Field Guide to Reptiles and Amphibians of Eastern and Central North America, Fourth Edition. Boston and New York: Houghton Mifflin Harcourt. xiv + 494 pp., 47 plates, 207 figures. . (Gopherus polyphemus, p. 230 + Plate 19 + Figure 205 on p. 459).
Smith HM, Brodie ED Jr (1982). Reptiles of North America: A Guide to Field Identification. New York: Golden Press. 240 pp.  (paperback),  (hardcover). (Gopherus polyphemus, pp. 62–63).

External links

Enchanted Forest Nature Sanctuary: Gopher tortoise
Gopherus polyphemus Blog of the Digital Library of Georgia

Gopherus
Reptiles of the United States
Fauna of the Southeastern United States
Symbols of Georgia (U.S. state)
Reptiles described in 1802
Articles containing video clips
Symbols of Florida